Nathalie Handal is a French-American poet, writer and professor,
described as a “contemporary Orpheus.” A New Yorker and a quintessential global citizen, she has published 10 prize-winning books, including Life in a Country Album. She is praised for her “diverse, and innovative body of work.”

Biography
Nathalie Handal is a French-American poet and writer born in the Caribbean to a Mediterranean Palestinian family from Bethlehem. She has lived in France, Italy, the United States, Latin America, the Caribbean, Asia and the Arab world. After earning a MFA in Creative Writing from Bennington College, Vermont and a MPhil in English and Drama at the University of London, Handal began writing and translating global literature in the 1990s. She currently resides in New York City, Rome and Paris and teaches at New York University.

Literary career

Handal has authored books of poetry, plays, essays, and has edited two anthologies and has been involved as a writer, director, or producer in several theatrical or film productions. Her work has been translated into over fifteen languages. She is a Lannan Foundation Fellow, Pen International Croatia Fellow, Centro Andaluz de las Letras Fellow, Fondazione di Venezia Fellow, recipient of the Alejo Zuloaga Order in Literature 2011, the AE Ventures Fellowship, an Honored Finalist for the 2009 Gift of Freedom Award, and was shortlisted for New London Writers Awards and The Arts Council of England Writers Awards. Her work has appeared in anthologies and magazines such as Vanity Fair, The New York Times, The Guardian, The Irish Times, World Literature Today, The Virginia Quarterly Review, Poetry New Zealand, Guernica Magazine, and The Nation.

Her book The Lives of Rain was shortlisted for the Agnes Lynch Starrett Poetry Prize and received the Menada Literary Award. Love and Strange Horses won the 2011 Gold Medal Independent Publisher Book Award (IPPY Award), and was an Honorable Mention at the San Francisco Book Festival and the New England Book Festival. The flash collection The Republics was called “one of the most inventive books by one of today’s most diverse writers” and is winner of the Virginia Faulkner Award for Excellence in Writing and the Arab American Book Award. And Life in a Country Album is winner of the Palestine Book Award and a Foreword Indies Book Award finalist.

Handal has edited the anthology The Poetry of Arab Women, which introduced Arab women poets to a wider audience in the West. It was an Academy of American Poets bestseller, named one of the top 10 Feminist Books by The Guardian, and it won the PEN Oakland/Josephine Miles Literary Award. She co-edited along with Tina Chang and Ravi Shankar the anthology Language for a New Century: Contemporary Poetry from the Middle East, Asia & Beyond. She has lectured or been a Visiting Writer at La Sorbonne in Paris, Ca' Foscari University of Venice, John Cabot in Rome, The American University in Beirut,  Picador Guest Professor at Leipzig University, Germany, and professor at Columbia University 
and part of the Low-Residency MFA faculty at Sierra Nevada University. Handal is currently a professor at New York University and a Visiting Writer at The American University in Rome.

She writes the literary travel column, "The City and the Writer," for Words Without Borders magazines, and "Eat: Everywhere a Tale," for Popula.

Publications
Poetry
 The Neverfield Poem (1999)
 The Lives of Rain (2005)
 Love and Strange Horses (University of Pittsburgh Press, 2010)
 Poet in Andalucía (University of Pittsburgh Press, 2012)
 The Invisible Star/La estrella invisible (Valparaíso Ediciones, 2014)
 The Republics (University of Pittsburgh Press, 2015)
 Life in a Country Album (University of Pittsburgh Press, 2019)
 Volo (Diode Editions, chapbook 2022)

Poetry / Foreign Publications
 Las horas suspendidas: poemas escogidos (Valparaíso Ediciones, 2012)
 Poeta en Andalucía (Visor, España, 2013)
 La estrella invisible (Valparaíso Ediciones, 2014)
 Riflessi, Artist Book, Illustrazioni di Lucio Schiavo (Damocle Edizioni,Venezia, 2016)
 Pjesnik u Andaluziji (Druga prica, Zagreb, 2017)
 التّلحمية Al-Talhamiyah (Jordan, 2017)
 Canto Mediterraneo (Ronzani Editore, Italia, 2018)
 Le vite della pioggia (Iacobelli Editore, Roma, Italia, 2018)
 Poet in Andalucia - Arabic (Takween, Damascus, 2019)
 Life in A Country Album - UK (flipped eye, United Kingdom 2020)
 Selected Poems: 2005-2019 (Fawasel Publishing House, Syria, 2022)
 De l'amour des étranges chevaux (Mémoire Encrier, Montreal and Paris, 03/03/2023)

Anthologies
 The Poetry of Arab Women (2001, ed. by Handal)
 Language for a New Century: Contemporary Poetry from the Middle East, Asia & Beyond  (W.W. Norton, 2008, ed. by Handal, Tina Chang and Ravi Shankar)

Plays
 Between Our Lips
 La Cosa Dei Sogni
 The Stonecutters
 The Details of Silence
 The Oklahoma Quartet
 Hakawatiyeh
 Men in Verse

Prose (creative nonfiction, fiction)
“The Night and Nightingale"  Guernica Magazine, March 2017
“My East in Venice"  Guernica Magazine, April 2017
“After Kaddish"  Guernica Magazine, September 2018

CDs
 Traveling Rooms
 Spell

Interviews and Reviews
 "Mahmoud Darwish: Palestine's Poet of Exile", The Progressive, May 2002
"Shades of a Bridge's Breath", This bridge we call home: radical visions for transformation, eds. Gloria E. Anzaldúa and Analouise Keating (Routledge, 2002).  
"Sisterhood of Hope", interview with Zainab Salbi, Saudi Aramco World, September/October 2010
"We Are All Going to Die", interview with Edwidge Dandicat, Guernica Magazine, January 2011
"The Other Face of Silence", interview with Elia Suleiman, Guernica Magazine, May 2011
"Not Quite Invisible", Nathalie Handal interviews Mark Strand, Guernica Magazine, April 2012
"Against the Line", interview with Jonathan Galassi, Guernica Magazine, June 2012
“Elisa Biagini: A World Reinvented Through Poetry,”  Guernica Magazine, February 7, 2014 
“Kareem James Abu-Zeid: A Search for Justice and Expansive Identities,"  Guernica Magazine, August 2014
“Isabella Hammad's The Parisian", Electric Literature, May 7, 2019
“Introduction to Edwidge Danticat", 92Y, September 2019

References

External links

 

1969 births
Palestinian poets
Palestinian women writers
20th-century American poets
20th-century American women writers
20th-century French poets
20th-century French women writers
Living people
21st-century American poets
21st-century American women writers
21st-century French poets
Alumni of the University of London
American women poets
Bennington College alumni
Columbia University staff
French women poets
Sierra Nevada College
PEN Oakland/Josephine Miles Literary Award winners
American writers in French
21st-century French women